The Government Communication and Information System (GCIS) is a South African government department primarily charged with managing government's public communication of their actions and policy. It falls under the authority of the Minister in The Presidency, which appoints the Director-General of the GCIS.

The Director-General of the GCIS is the official spokesperson of the South African Government. The corporation was established on 18 May 1998, according to terms of Section 7 (Subsection 2 and 3) of the Public Service Act, 1994.

List of CEOs of GCIS
 Joel Netshitenzhe (1998–2006)
 Themba Maseko (2006–present)

External links
 GCIS

Government agencies of South Africa
Executive branch of the government of South Africa